Monkey Twins is a 2018 Thai-language television series created by Nontakorn Taweesuk and starring Phakhin Khamwilaisak, Alisa Kunkwaeng and Akkarat Nimitchai. The plot revolves around a cop teaming up with a martial artist to infiltrate an organized crime ring of drug dealers and corruption within the legal system.

It was released between June 2, 2018 and September 1, 2018 on GMM One.

The series was distributed by Netflix between 2018 and 2022.

Cast

Main cast
 Phakin Khamwilaisak as Mawin
 Samrej Muuengbudh as Neur
 Alisa Kunkwaeng as Namtarn
 Akkarat Nimitchai as Taycho
 Zozeen Panyanut Jirarottanakasem as Lin-in
 Yanin Vismitananda as Tamako
 Dan Chupong as Saming
 Prasat Thong-Aram as Grandpa Kla
 Warawut Phoyim as Puek
 Pichaya Tippala as Aom
 Athiwat Sanitwong na Ayuddhaya as Chanchai
 David Asavanond as Dej
 Amphan Charoensukraph as Meng
 Prab Yuttapichai as Ekkachai
 Jirawat Wachirasarunpat as Yamoto
 Saicheer Wongwirot as Chia

Recurring cast
 Sillapin Thong-Aram as Yim
 Glot Atthaseri as Phong
 Nattapat Wipatdejtrakul as Mei-Fern
 Wittaya Pansri-ngam

Guest
 Ariyakorn Bowornwitsarut as Lin
 Somboon Likitsatianchai
 Meng Po Pla Group
 Lingprakit Sitprakan's Monkey circus Group

Release
Monkey Twins was released between June 2, 2018 and September 1, 2018 on GMM One.

References

External links
 
 

Thai television series
2010s Thai television series
Thai-language television shows
2018 Thai television series debuts